Pauline Ado is a French professional surfer. She won a bronze medal for France at the World Surfing Championship.

Early life 
She was born on 14 February 1991 in Bayonne.

Career 
She won two junior championships in 2005. At the age of 17 she became the first non-Australian to win a junior world championship in 2009. In 2016, she is ranked 9 at QS ranking. She won a bronze medal at the 2016 ISA World Surfing Games, Playa Jaco, Jacó, in Costa Rica.

References

External links
Profile in World Surf League

French surfers
French female surfers
Living people
1991 births
World Surf League surfers
Sportspeople from Pyrénées-Atlantiques
Olympic surfers of France
Surfers at the 2020 Summer Olympics
21st-century French women